The 2018 Canada Women's Sevens was the fourth tournament within the 2017–18 World Rugby Women's Sevens Series and the fourth edition of the Canada Women's Sevens to be played in the series. It was held over the weekend of 12–13 May 2018 at Westhills Stadium in Langford, British Columbia.

Format
The teams are drawn into three pools of four teams each. Each team plays every other team in their pool once. The top two teams from each pool advance to the Cup brackets while the top 2 third place teams also compete in the Cup/Plate. The other teams from each group play-off for the Challenge Trophy.

Teams
Eleven core teams are participating in the tournament along with one invited team, Brazil:

Pool stage
All times in Pacific Daylight Time (UTC−07:00)

Pool A

Pool B

Pool C

Knockout stage

Challenge Trophy

5th place

Cup

Tournament placings

Source: World Rugby

Players

Scoring leaders

Source: World Rugby

Dream Team
The following seven players were selected to the tournament Dream Team at the conclusion of the tournament:

See also
 World Rugby Women's Sevens Series
 2017–18 World Rugby Women's Sevens Series

References

External links
 Tournament Page

2018
2017–18 World Rugby Women's Sevens Series
2018 in Canadian rugby union
2018 in Canadian women's sports
2018 in women's rugby union
Canada Women's Sevens
Sports competitions in British Columbia